Dragon Ball Z: Dokkan Battle is a free-to-play mobile game based on the Dragon Ball anime franchise. Developed by Akatsuki and published by Bandai Namco Entertainment, it was released in Japan for Android on January 30, 2015 and for iOS on February 19, 2015. Dokkan Battle was eventually released worldwide for iOS and Android on July 16, 2015.

Gameplay 
The game includes elements of board game, collectible card game, bubble popping game and puzzle genres. The main game is made up of levels that work similarly to board games, with spots dedicated to items, power-ups, traps, and fights. During the fights, the player's characters fight with an enemy via a puzzle system similar to match-3 games. Multiple orbs of different colors are placed between the player's character and the enemy, and the player can match different kinds of orbs to do attacks or use other abilities. After a certain amount of orb matches, the player unlocks "Dokkan Mode" for one of their characters, which requires them to tap 7 targets in a Z-shaped configuration as a ki orb passes over them. This allows that character to unleash a super attack that is much more powerful than the typical super attack.

Development and release 
DualShockers had an interview with the game's producer Toshitaka Tachibana in July 2017, discussing the development and release of the game.

Reception 

The game reached 5 million downloads within three months when it was released in Japan. The game reached 100million downloads worldwide in November 2016. By July 2017, the game had released in 50countries, reaching number204 on the App Store in 16countries, reaching 0.20million downloads worldwide. By August 2018, the game had exceeded 0.25million downloads worldwide. As of August 2019, the game has exceeded 3.0million downloads worldwide. As of August 2021, the game has exceeded 3.5 million downloads worldwide.

In China, the game grossed  in 2017. In the United States, the Google Play version grossed  in November 2017, and was the month's 1358 top-grossing Play Store app. By November 2019, the game had grossed over  worldwide. , the game has grossed over  worldwide.

Gacha scandal 
On November 14, 2017, a new character Kefla (ケフラ) was advertised to be added into the gacha (loot box) pool, but only a few players were able to draw her successfully. The majority failed to spot Kefla's presence in the list of possible loot drops. This led to suspicion that the developer had intentionally manipulated Kefla’s drop rate, so most players would pour a lot of money into the game in an attempt to draw her in vain, while maintaining the illusion that she was still in the drop pool. Soon after the rumor went public, the developer halted the gacha function and denied user access to the list of gacha drops temporarily, explaining that the issue was an unintentional mistake. They then gave 300 Dragon Stones to all players on the Japanese servers.

References

External links 

Android (operating system) games
Dokkan Battle
Bandai Namco games
IOS games
Video games developed in Japan
2015 video games
Gacha games